is a Ryukyuan gusuku in Tomigusuku, Okinawa. The castle is in ruins.

References

Castles in Okinawa Prefecture